The Women competition at the IBSF World Championships 2019 was held on March 7 and 8, 2019.

Results
The first two runs were started on March 7 at 12:34 and the last two runs on March 8 at 12:34.

References

Women